Stefan Panayotov (born 26 July 1941) is a Bulgarian boxer. He competed in the men's flyweight event at the 1964 Summer Olympics. At the 1964 Summer Olympics, he lost to Artur Olech of Poland in the Round of 32.

References

External links
 

1941 births
Living people
Bulgarian male boxers
Olympic boxers of Bulgaria
Boxers at the 1964 Summer Olympics
Place of birth missing (living people)
Flyweight boxers